4-hydroxybutanoyl-CoA dehydratase is an enzyme with systematic name 4-hydroxybutanoyl-CoA hydro-lyase. This enzyme catalyses the following chemical reaction

 4-hydroxybutanoyl-CoA  (E)-but-3-enoyl-CoA + H2O

This enzyme contains FAD and a [4Fe-4S] iron-sulfur cluster.

References

External links 
 

EC 4.2.1